The 2020–21 Al Ahly season is the 113th season in the football club's history and 62st consecutive and overall season in the top flight of Egyptian football, the Egyptian Premier League. In addition to the domestic league, Al Ahly also are participating in this season's editions of the domestic cup, the Egypt Cup, the Egyptian Super Cup, and the first-tier African cup, the CAF Champions League. The season covers a period from 13 December 2020 to 30 July 2021.

Kit information
Supplier: Umbro
Sponsors: WE, SAIB Bank, GLC Paints, Tiger Chips, Royal Dutch Shell

Players

Current squad

As of 20 December 2020

Youth Academy

Transfers

Transfers in

Transfers out

Loans out

Competitions

Overview

Egyptian Premier League

League table

Results summary

Results by round

Matches
The fixtures for the 2020–21 season were announced on 23 November 2020.

Egypt Cup

Egyptian Super Cup

CAF Super Cup

CAF Champions League

Al Ahly entered the competition for the 3rd consecutive time after winning the league and the CAF Champions League in the previous season. Al Ahly were ranked first in the CAF 5-year ranking prior to the start of the 2020–21 season. As a result, they entered the competition from the first round.

First round

Al Ahly were drawn against the winner of the tie involving AS SONIDEP from Niger and Mogadishu City from Somalia, which was won by the former.

Group stage 

The draw for the group stage was held on 8 January 2021. Al Ahly were drawn in Group A alongside AS Vita Club from the Democratic Republic of the Congo, Simba from Tanzania and Al Merrikh from Sudan.

Group A

Quarter-finals

The draw for the quarter-finals was held on 30 April 2021. Al Ahly were drawn against Mamelodi Sundowns from South Africa.

Semi-finals

Final

FIFA Club World Cup

Statistics

Goalscorers

Clean sheets

Notes

References

Al Ahly SC seasons
Egyptian football clubs 2020–21 season
2020–21 CAF Champions League participants seasons
Al Ahly